Jere Cooper (July 20, 1893 – December 18, 1957) was a Democratic United States Representative from Tennessee.

Biography
Cooper was born on a farm near Dyersburg, Dyer County, Tennessee, son of Joseph W. and Viola May (Cooper) Cooper. He attended public schools and then was graduated from the Cumberland School of Law in Lebanon, Tennessee, in 1914. He was admitted to the bar in 1915 and commenced practice in Dyersburg, Tennessee. He married Mary Rankley in December 1930; the couple had one son, Leon Jere Cooper, who died as a child.

Career
Upon the U.S. entry into World War I in 1917, Cooper enlisted in the Second Tennessee Infantry, National Guard, and was commissioned a First Lieutenant. Later he was transferred, with his company, to Co K, 119th Infantry, Thirtieth Division, and served in France and Belgium. On July 9, 1918, he was promoted to Captain and served as regimental adjutant until discharged from the Army on April 2, 1919. After the war he resumed the practice of law in Dyersburg.

Cooper was a member of the city council and city attorney from 1920 to 1928, and was elected Department Commander of the American Legion of Tennessee in 1921.

Elected as a Democrat to the 71st, and to the fourteen succeeding, Congresses, Cooper served from March 4, 1929, until his death. He served as chairman of the U.S. House Committee on Ways and Means (84th and 85th Congresses), and on the Joint Committee on Internal Revenue Taxation (Eighty-fifth Congress).

He was a signatory to the 1956 Southern Manifesto that opposed the desegregation of public schools ordered by the Supreme Court in Brown v. Board of Education.

Death
Cooper died in Bethesda, Maryland, on December 18, 1957 (age 64 years, 151 days). He is interred at Fairview Cemetery, Dyersburg, Tennessee.

See also
 List of United States Congress members who died in office (1950–99)

References

External links

 Retrieved on 2008-02-10

1893 births
1957 deaths
United States Army personnel of World War I
American Presbyterians
American segregationists
United States Army officers
Democratic Party members of the United States House of Representatives from Tennessee
20th-century American politicians
People from Dyer County, Tennessee